The 1946–47 Fort Wayne Zollner Pistons season was the sixth season of the franchise in the National Basketball League. For the first time Fort Wayne had to play without four time league MVP  Bobby McDermott who left the team mid season. The team also lost star guard Buddy Jeannette during the off season but did get the return of power forward  Blackie Towery. The Pistons finished the season second place in the eastern division and defeated the Toledo Jeeps 3-2 in the opening round of the playoffs before falling to the Rochester Royals in 3 games.

Roster

League standings

Eastern Division

Western Division

References

Fort Wayne Zollner Pistons seasons
Fort Wayne